Android Froyo is the sixth version of Android and is a codename of the Android mobile operating system developed by Google, spanning versions between 2.2 and 2.2.3. Those versions are no longer supported. It was unveiled on May 20, 2010, during the Google I/O 2010 conference. Google ceased sign-in support with a Google account for Android Froyo to Android Gingerbread on September 27, 2021. 

One of the most prominent changes in the Froyo release was USB tethering and Wi-Fi hotspot functionality. Other changes include support for the Android Cloud to Device Messaging (C2DM) service, enabling push notifications, additional application speed improvements, implemented through JIT compilation and displayed within applications as top-of-the-screen banners.

Features 

New features introduced by Froyo include the following:
 Speed, memory, and performance optimizations.
 Additional application speed improvements, implemented through JIT compilation.
 Integration of Chrome's V8 JavaScript engine into the Browser application.
 Support for the Android Cloud to Device Messaging (C2DM) service, enabling push notifications.
 Improved Microsoft Exchange support, including security policies, auto-discovery, GAL look-up, calendar synchronization and remote wipe.
 Improved application launcher with shortcuts to Phone and Browser applications.
 USB tethering and Wi-Fi hotspot functionality.
 Option to disable data access over a mobile network.
 Updated Market application with batch and automatic update features.
 Quick switching between multiple keyboard languages and their dictionaries.
 Support for Bluetooth-enabled car and desk docks.
 Support for numeric and alphanumeric passwords.
 Support for file upload fields in the Browser application.
 The browser now shows all frames of animated GIFs instead of just the first frame.
 Support for installing applications to the expandable memory.
 Adobe Flash support.
 Support for high-PPI displays (up to 320 ppi), such as four-inch 720p screens.
 Introduced .asec file extension.
 Gallery allows users to view picture stacks using a zoom gesture.

See also 
 Android version history
 iOS 4
 Mac OS X Snow Leopard
 Windows Mobile 6.5
 Windows 7

References

External links 
 
 

Android (operating system)
2010 software